Gregory J. Goff ("Greg") is an American businessman the president and chief executive officer of Andeavor, formerly Tesoro, where he has been since May 2010. As of May 2021 he was elected to the board of ExxonMobil; notably, he is one of the first environment-friendly board members of this Big Oil company.

Education
Goff graduated from the University of Utah with a BS degree in 1978. He graduated with an MBA from the University of Utah in 1981.

Career at Tesoro and Andeavor
Goff became the president and chief executive officer of Tesoro Corporation in May 2010. He became the chairman and chief executive officer of Tesoro Logistics in April 2011.

Board memberships
Goff is on a number of boards. In May of 2021, Goff was elected to the board of ExxonMobil.

References

American chief executives of Fortune 500 companies
University of Utah alumni
Living people
S.J. Quinney College of Law alumni
American business executives
Year of birth missing (living people)
Directors of ExxonMobil